Maha Hassan is a Syrian-Kurdish journalist and novelist. She was born in Aleppo. A native Kurdish speaker, she writes in Arabic. In 2000, she was banned from publishing in her native Syria for her "morally condemnable" writing, and since August 2004, she has been living in self-imposed exile in Paris.

In 2005, she was awarded a Hellman/Hammett grant for persecuted writers by Human Rights Watch. In 2007-2008, Hassan lived for a year at the invitation of Amsterdam Vluchtstad in the renovated apartment of Anne Frank and her family at the Amsterdam Merwedeplein.

Hassan's novels Habl suri (Umbilical Cord, 2011) and al-Rawiyat (The Novels, 2014) and were longlisted for the Arabic Booker Prize. In 2021, her novel The Neighbourhood of Wonder was shortlisted for the Naguib Mahfouz Medal for Literature.

Bibliography
 The Infinite: Biography of the Other
 The Picture on the Cover
 Hymns of Nothingness
 The Tunnel of Existence
 Daughters of the Wilderness
 Habl suri (Umbilical Cord 2011)
 al-Rawiyat (The Novels 2014)
Metro Halab (Aleppo Subway, 2017)
Amat sabahan ayatuha al-harb (2018).
The Neighbourhood of Wonder

References

People from Aleppo
Syrian Kurdish women
Syrian journalists
Syrian women journalists
Syrian women novelists
Syrian novelists
Syrian exiles
Year of birth missing (living people)
20th-century novelists
Living people
20th-century women writers
21st-century Syrian women writers
21st-century Syrian writers